Riviera (colloquially, "the Riv") was a hotel and casino on the Las Vegas Strip in Winchester, Nevada, which operated from April 1955 to May 2015. It was last owned by the Las Vegas Convention and Visitors Authority, which decided to demolish it to make way for the Las Vegas Global Business District.

The hotel had more than 2,100 rooms, fewer than half of which were located in a 23-story tower. The casino had  of gaming space.

History

Development and founding
The casino was first proposed by Detroit mobster William Bischoff as the Casa Blanca, and received a gaming license in 1952. Bischoff later withdrew from the project, which was taken over by Miami businessman Samuel Cohen. By March 1955, Cohen, identified as a member of Miami's S & G gambling syndicate, was no longer part of the investment group, though rumors persisted that he secretly maintained an involvement. Marx Brothers Harpo and Gummo held minority interests at the opening.

The Riviera opened on April 20, 1955, as the first high-rise at 9 stories, and the ninth resort on the Las Vegas Strip. The resort was designed by Miami architects Roy F. France & Son with J Maher Weller of Las Vegas serving as associate architect. The general contractor selected to build the resort was Taylor Construction Co. of Miami. Liberace cut the opening ribbon, and became the first resident performer. The Riviera became one of the oldest and most famous casino resorts in Las Vegas Valley. The Riviera also broke new ground in its design: previously, Strip resorts resembled roadside motor courts.

The opening of the Riviera, along with The Dunes and the Royal Nevada casino resorts within a month were the subject of a famous issue of Life magazine, on June 20, 1955, with a Moulin Rouge showgirl on its cover. The headline was "Las Vegas—Is Boom Overextended?" and a story about how Las Vegas had built too many hotel rooms to be profitable.

Bankruptcy and new ownership

The Riviera casino went bankrupt just three months after opening. A group of former Flamingo Hotel managers led by Gus Greenbaum took over operation of the property, leasing it from the ownership group. Greenbaum had recently retired, and it was widely suspected that he was coerced to return to work by threats from Chicago mob boss Tony Accardo.

Among Greenbaum's staff was entertainment director William Nelson, who was soon discovered to be mob informer Willie Bioff, leading to his murder in November 1955.

Greenbaum's drug and gambling addictions led to his embezzling from the casino.  In December 1958, Greenbaum and his wife were murdered in their Phoenix, Arizona home, reportedly on the orders of either Meyer Lansky or Tony Accardo.

An 8-story expansion was made off the south side of the original 9-story tower in 1959. It was designed by Los Angeles architect Welton Becket. A 12-story tower was added off the south west side of the 8-story tower in 1965. The new tower expansion was designed by Harold W. Levitt with Ernest W. Le Duc and William H. Farwell as consulting architects.

Mob fixer Sidney Korshak played a major role in the property's management. Law enforcement agencies suspected that he represented the Chicago Outfit's interest in the Riviera, and was responsible for skimming the casino's revenue and delivering the proceeds to Chicago.

The Riviera was purchased in June 1968 by a group including bankers E. Parry Thomas and Jerome Mack, and investors tied to the Parvin-Dohrmann Corp., owner of the Aladdin, Stardust, and Fremont casinos. In 1969, a deal was made to sell the Riviera to the Parvin-Dohrmann Corp., but the sale was blocked by the Nevada Gaming Control Board due to the company's previous failure to report a change of ownership.

Dean Martin was hired in 1969 to perform in the casino's showroom, and was given a 10% interest in the Riviera. Martin left in 1972, after management refused his request to cut his performance schedule from two nightly shows to one; the Riviera bought back his shares.

In 1973, the Riviera was purchased for $60 million by AITS Inc., a Boston-based travel company controlled by Meshulam Riklis and Isidore Becker. The Riviera is the setting for the movie Fake-Out (aka. Nevada Heat, 1982), which was financed by Riklis and starring his wife, Pia Zadora.

The 17 story Monte Carlo Tower was constructed circa 1974. The tower was designed by Martin Stern Jr. & Associates. The 6 story San Remo Tower also a Stern design was constructed in 1977 by the Del E. Webb Corporation.

Expansion (1983–2009)
The Riviera filed for Chapter 11 bankruptcy protection in 1983. Riklis pledged money to keep the business in operation, and appointed Jeffrey Silver as CEO to turn the Riviera around. Silver began shifting the Riviera's marketing focus away from high rollers, and towards middle- and working-class gamblers. He opened a Burger King franchise in the building, the first fast food chain outlet in a casino; this move inspired the phrase "Burger King Revolution" to refer to the broader trend of Las Vegas casinos catering to middle-class customers.

The Riviera underwent an expansion from 1988 to 1990 this included the 24 story Monaco Tower also designed by Martin Stern Jr. and two parking garages. The project went significantly over budget, leading the parent company to file again for Chapter 11 bankruptcy protection in 1991. The business emerged from bankruptcy in 1993 as Riviera Holdings Corp., owned by the previous secured creditors.

2010 bankruptcy
On July 12, 2010, Riviera Holdings filed for Chapter 11 bankruptcy. Its bankruptcy included a reorganization plan under which secured lenders, led by Starwood Capital Group, would receive new debt and stock. The plan was negotiated with holders of 2/3 of the secured debt worth over $275 million, which included a $225 million term loan, unpaid interest and amounts owing on a swap agreement. Riviera Holdings listed assets and liabilities of $100 to $500 million each.

Under the terms of the agreement negotiated by Starwood, secured lenders would receive a new $50 million loan plus 80% of the new stock. Lenders who provide $20 million in a so-called new money loan would receive 8% of the new stock plus warrants for another 10%. Creditors who provide a $10 million working capital loan would receive 7% of the new stock. The last 5% of the new stock goes to the lenders in return for providing a backstop insuring availability for the $30 million in loans. Existing Riviera shareholders received nothing.

The Riviera lost $4.5 million on income of $30.8 million in the first quarter of 2010. The decline in popularity of the Riviera was caused in part by the decline of pedestrian foot traffic in the vicinity. Previously, the Riviera was surrounded by the Stardust, New Frontier, and Westward Ho, properties which were demolished to make room for new construction. A shutdown in the new construction in progress at the adjacent Fontainebleau Resort Las Vegas and Echelon Place contributed to the Riviera's decline. The company had 1300 employees in Las Vegas and 260 employees in Black Hawk, Colorado.

Closure and demolition (2015–16)

In February 2015, the Las Vegas Convention and Visitors Authority (LVCVA) acquired the Riviera hotel and its associated land for $182.5 million. The property was leased back to its existing operators, Paragon Gaming, who officially closed the establishment on Monday, May 4, 2015. After winding down operations the hotel was closed and demolished to make way for a planned expansion of LVCVA's Las Vegas Global Business District exhibit and meeting center project.

Due to its size, the Riviera was demolished through two separate implosions conducted in June and August 2016. Work began by gutting the Monaco Tower while the hotel parking garages and the Versailles Theater were demolished - the work took place during the summer. Next came the demolition of the San Remo Tower. Much of the property was demolished during the first implosion. Asbestos was discovered in the hotel's Monte Carlo tower and in the 1960s towers, and was removed prior to the implosion. Demolition cost a total of $42 million. Both implosions were handled by Controlled Demolition, Inc., which had handled every prior resort implosion in Las Vegas up to this point.

The first implosion took place at 2:35 a.m. (Pacific Time) on June 14, 2016, taking down the 24-story Monaco tower. A firework display and countdown led up to the implosion.

After the implosion of the Monaco Tower, the casino area was demolished followed by the 8-story 1959 tower. The original 9-story tower built in 1955 was demolished next. It was the oldest remaining structure on the Strip.

On August 16, 2016, at 2:30 a.m., the Monte Carlo tower along with the 12-story tower constructed in 1965 were imploded.

Future
LVCVA had intended to use the former Riviera property for parking, outdoor exhibitions, and as a new gateway to the convention center. However, these plans were changed when LVCVA acquired new nearby acreage which negated the need for the entire Riviera property. In 2019, LVCVA put 10 acres of the 26-acre Riviera site up for sale. The acreage is located along the Las Vegas Strip, at the southeast corner of Elvis Presley Boulevard. In 2021, an agreement was reached to sell the property to Claudio Fischer, a Chilean real estate developer who had built several casino resorts in South America. Fischer would purchase the site for $120 million, and intends to build a new hotel-casino on the land. Construction would not begin until at least April 2023, as LVCVA has a lease agreement to continue using the land for convention-related purposes until then.

Gaming
The  casino floor offered about 1,000 slot machines and 25 table games, including craps, blackjack, and roulette, along with mini-baccarat, Let It Ride, and Three Card Poker. The Riviera poker room closed in 2013, two years before the remaining gaming operations.

In August 2011, the Riviera re-opened its bingo room, in an attempt to bring in new customers and compete against newer resorts on the Strip. At that time, it was the only casino on the Strip to offer bingo. The Riviera also had one of the largest bingo rooms in Las Vegas, and was voted the 'Best Bingo Room' by the Las Vegas Review-Journal. The Riviera later launched a marketing partnership with Buffalo Studios, a company that had created a Facebook bingo game titled Bingo Blitz. Beginning in May 2012, the game allowed players to play online bingo on a web page that featured an image of the Riviera, as a marketing move to attract customers.

The casino had a sportsbook operated by William Hill.

Entertainment
Liberace was the featured headliner at the resort's opening, and for many years afterward.

In 2006, Splash, a traditional Las Vegas revue created by Jeff Kutash, ended an extended 22-year run at the Riviera.

In 2009, An Evening at La Cage, featuring female impersonators including Frank Marino and his impersonation of Joan Rivers, ended one of the longest runs in Strip history.

Crazy Girls
The resort had one long-running show:
Crazy Girls, a topless show. The performers for Crazy Girls, including transgender showgirl Jahna Steele, are immortalized with a bronze sculpture at the front of the casino unveiled in 1997 with the phrase No "Ifs", "Ands" or.... The thong-clad buttocks on it have been worn to a shine by passers-by rubbing them. The sculpture is based on a promotional photo for the show. Riviera ads with the same photo used to appear on Vegas taxicabs, and it was restored for a shot in the film Domino. The Crazy Girls were the inspiration for the 2008 film Crazy Girls Undercover. Crazy Girls relocated to Planet Hollywood Las Vegas and then closed on May 14, 2021.

All of these shows were associate produced and booked by Sam Distefano, the resort's vice-president of Entertainment and Special Events, who signed George Burns, Bob Hope, Tony Bennett, and Frank Sinatra to a special two-year contract to perform on a recurring basis.

Jan Rouven
 Starlight Theater In June 2011 the Starlite Theatre reopened its doors. Mary Wilson of The Supremes was the headliner through July 4, 2011. The Village People and comedian Andrew Dice Clay also headlined the venue.  In June 2012 German Illusionist Jan Rouven took over the Starlite Theatre to headline there six nights a week. His show Illusions became one of the most successful shows the Riviera ever had. He became a headliner at The New Tropicana Las Vegas in November 2014, but his show closed 15 months later amid child pornography charges.

Previous acts
Barbra and Frank: The Concert That Never Was, (Barbra Streisand and Frank Sinatra impersonators). This show has now moved to the off strip Las Vegas Westin Casuarina.
 Dao – The Asian Celebration, which according to the Riviera's website offers "acrobatics, dance and martial arts in fusion with stunning costumes, exquisite stage design and beautiful music... mind and body in motion".
 ICE, an ice dancing show featuring Russian skaters; cancelled in November 2009.
Greg London's ICONS
Society of Seven
Pat DiNizio's 'Confessions Of A Rock Star' 
Mike Tricarichi Presents Steve-O & Tom Green's 'Icons of Comedy: Original Pranksters Tour' with opening act Tom Garland
Gorgeous Ladies of Wrestling (GLOW)

Pocket billiards (Pool)

As of 2010, the Riviera had a near-monopoly on championship-level North American and international amateur pool (pocket billiards) tournaments held in the United States, aside from the Florida-based U.S. Amateur Championship. The hotel's convention center hosted the Billiard Congress of America, American Poolplayers Association, Valley National 8-Ball Association and American Cuesports Alliance pool leagues' annual international championships, and various related events. BCA scheduled their 2011 and 2012 amateur championships at the Riviera, as well as the 2011 professional U.S. Open Ten-ball Championship. BCA moved their 2013 events to Rio All Suite Hotel and Casino VNEA announced in May 2010 that their event would move to Bally's, further down the Strip, in 2011.

APA held annual events at the Riviera for 23 years up until its closure. In the week prior to the Riviera's close, the APA held their Annual League Operator's Convention as well as their 2015 National Singles Championship. At 7PM on May 3, 2015, APA President Reneé Lyle and Marketing Director Jason Bowman held an awards ceremony for the APA's 2015 8-Ball Classic - the final event to be held at the Riviera.

In popular culture
The Riviera was often chosen as a shooting location due to its history and recognition as a landmark. Portions of the following features were filmed at The Riviera:

Ocean's 11 (1960)
Bob & Carol & Ted & Alice (1969)
Diamonds Are Forever (1971)
 Butterfly (1982)
Casino (1995)
Showgirls (1995)
Mars Attacks! (1996)
Austin Powers: International Man of Mystery (1997)
Con Air (1997)
Vegas Vacation (1997)
Go (1999)
3000 Miles to Graceland (2001)
Crazy Girls Undercover (2008)
21 (2008)
The Hangover (2009)
Ghost Adventures (2012, 2016)
Sky (2015)
Jason Bourne (2016)

The majority of the television series Gorgeous Ladies of Wrestling was shot in the Riviera Hotel during its four-year run and subsequent 1991 pay-per-view. The game show Hollywood Squares also taped its final syndicated season at the Riviera, from 1980 to 1981.  There was also a radio booth inside the casino where live telecasts were made featuring various guests.

Sports
The Riviera was the site of the first boxing match between Larry Holmes and Michael Spinks on September 21, 1985. Spinks won in an upset on a unanimous decision, winning Holmes's International Boxing Federation heavyweight championship, and preventing Holmes from tying Rocky Marciano's undefeated 49–0 record.

In 1994, the Riviera was the host of the practice field for the short lived Las Vegas Posse of the Canadian Football League during the league's brief U.S. expansion . Built on a former parking lot on Riviera property, the Posse practiced on a smaller-than-regulation field (only 70 yards long) where a sign read "Field of ImPOSSEable Dreams." The team folded after the 1994 season.

Gallery

See also

References

External links 

Riviera Hotel and Casino – Official Site
Chicago Mob influence on Las Vegas
Reuters: Riviera shareholders reject offer (August 29, 2006)
 Riviera Hotel and Casino bankruptcy in Las Vegas
 Riviera Hotel and Casino bankruptcy in the news
 Riviera Holdings Corporation files for Chapter 11 bankruptcy protection
 Las Vegas' Riviera Hotel & Casino owner files for bankruptcy

Hotels established in 1955
Hotels disestablished in 2015
Defunct casinos in the Las Vegas Valley
Landmarks in Nevada
Las Vegas Strip
Skyscraper hotels in Winchester, Nevada
1955 establishments in Nevada
2015 disestablishments in Nevada
Buildings and structures demolished in 2016
Casino hotels
Defunct hotels in the Las Vegas Valley
Demolished hotels in Clark County, Nevada
Buildings and structures demolished by controlled implosion